Slaughter Creek may refer to:

 Slaughter Creek (Maryland)
 Slaughter Creek (South Dakota)